Roberts Arm is a small town located near Crescent Lake, Newfoundland and Labrador, Canada in Division No. 8, Newfoundland and Labrador. It is found on the northern part of Newfoundland. Roberts Arm boasts of its Lake Monster, Cressie, which is claimed to be living in Crescent Lake. Recent years saw the development of a majestic hiking trail which encompasses the end of the lake nearest to the community, Hazelnut Adventure Trail.

History
Roberts Arm is listed on the British Admiralty map of Notre Dame Bay, dated March 1883.

Post office Directory 1887, 1891, 1892, notes Roberts Arm.

Supreme Court Central Circuit notes Roberts Arm in 1886

Supreme Court Northern Circuit notes Roberts Arm in 1879

Newfoundland census of 1891 notes Rabbits Arm.

The Hilda Wooden Schooner built at Roberts Arm in 1877.

-------

"Until the early 1900s Roberts Arm was known as Rabbits Arm because of the abundance of snowshoe hare in the area. Local rabbit was sold to a factory located in South Brook. John Roberts, who was an influential member of the community, owned a large quantity of land in what is now called the subdivision. He is believed to be the inspiration behind the name Roberts Arm. When people first came to this area, they would stay only for the winter months to trap, and return to their homes on the outlying Baie Verte, Newfoundland and Labrador Green Bay islands in the spring.

"It was logging, however, that was to be the economic backbone of Roberts Arm. Between 1930 and 1935 Peter Parsons from Long Island was contracted to produce pit props for the overseas market. The wood was driven via a brook to Tommy's Arm (a shipping depot for pit prop and pulpwood located about three miles outside of the community) and loaded on ships to be taken to its destination. William Faulkner from Point Leamington also produced pit prop, working from Tommy's Arm during the Depression years. Both operations were small scale and short term. By 1935, 45 residents lived in the community. By 1966 there were 978. Mark Rowsell was the local merchant, but many residents traded at Pilley's Island or Little Bay Islands. In 1937 Roberts Arm became a major center for pulpwood. Bowater came to town under the supervision of A. J. Hewlett who was born and raised there. Men from other communities working in Tommy's Arm moved to Roberts Arm with their families. The population was on the rise ... "

Shortly after Bowaters started operation in Tommy's Arm, the men went on strike due to bad camp conditions and low wages. What was known as the Roberts Arm Strike was short lived when Sir Eric Bowater stated that he would shut down operation. A representative of the strikers apologized to Bowater and Hewlett and stated that they would gladly return to work for $2.00 per cord. To this, Bowater responded that operation would continue.

Excerpts from Moments in Time, by the Green Bay Economic Development Association 1994.

Demographics 

See also
 List of cities and towns in Newfoundland and Labrador

References

External links
Roberts Arm Facebook page
Mike Anthony Photography; Roberts Arm
Kavorka Designs; Roberts Arm
Kavorka.me; Roberts Arm's very first social media network. Operated and based in Roberts Arm, and owned by "Kavorka Designs(Mike Anthony)"
Pansy's Flower & Gift Shop; Roberts Arm's owned flower & gift shop, located in the center of the town(24a Main Street). Owned by "Pansy Roberts"
Roberts Arm Cap Site
Green Bay Trails; Roberts Arm
Roberts Arm Library
Hazelnut Adventure Trail
Roberts Arm - Encyclopedia of Newfoundland and Labrador, vol. 4, p. 606-607.

Populated coastal places in Canada
Towns in Newfoundland and Labrador
Logging communities in Canada